Boraj Tawaran is a village in the Udaipur district of Rajasthan, India. It comes under the Malpur gram panchayat, in Salumber block. The village is located 8 km east of Salumber. It is also known as Boraj Tanwaran or Boraj Tavraan. Salumbar is nearest town to Boraj Tawaran village.
Around 1700 CE, a Thakur of the Tanwar clan moved to Salumber during the rule of Rawat Kesari Singh Chundawat ("Rawat" is a princely title). In 1876, his descendant Thakur Tej Singh Tanwar was granted the jagir of the present-day village site to Rawat Jodh Singh Chundawat.

School
Govt.Sr.Sec.School-Boraj
Govt.Primary School-Boraj Tanwaran

Demographics

The Boraj Tawaran village has population of 571 of which 289 are males while 282 are females as per Population Census 2011.

In Boraj Tawaran village population of children with age 0-6 is 140 which makes up 24.52% of total population of village. Average Sex Ratio of Boraj Tawaran village is 976 which is higher than Rajasthan state average of 928. Child Sex Ratio for the Boraj Tawaran as per census is 1090, higher than Rajasthan average of 888.

Boraj Tawaran village has lower literacy rate compared to Rajasthan. In 2011, literacy rate of Boraj Tawaran village was 47.56% compared to 66.11% of Rajasthan. In Boraj Tawaran Male literacy stands at 58.11% while female literacy rate was 36.36%.

As per constitution of India and Panchyati Raaj Act, Boraj Tawaran village is administrated by Sarpanch (Head of Village) who is elected representative of village.

Caste Constitution
In Boraj Tawaran village, most of the village population is from Schedule Tribe (ST). Schedule Tribe (ST) constitutes 89.67% of total population in Boraj Tawaran village. There is no population of Schedule Caste (SC) in Boraj Tawaran village of Udaipur.

Work Profile
In Boraj Tawaran village out of total population, 308 were engaged in work activities. 99.03% of workers describe their work as Main Work (Employment or Earning more than 6 Months) while 0.97% were involved in Marginal activity providing livelihood for less than 6 months. Of 308 workers engaged in Main Work, 295 were cultivators (owner or co-owner) while 2 were Agricultural labourer.

References 

Villages in Udaipur district